Guy Creighton (born 1 September 1949) is an Australian equestrian. He competed at the 1976 Summer Olympics and the 1984 Summer Olympics.

References

External links
 

1949 births
Living people
Australian male equestrians
Olympic equestrians of Australia
Equestrians at the 1976 Summer Olympics
Equestrians at the 1984 Summer Olympics
20th-century Australian people